The Protestant mission began in the Chinese province of Sichuan (formerly romanized as Szechwan, Szechuan, or Ssuchuan; also referred to as "West China" or "Western China") in 1877, when premises were rented by the China Inland Mission in Chungking. However, it grew rather slowly, it was not until the late 1980s that Protestantism experienced rapid growth. The two largest denominations in the province before 1949 were Anglicanism and Methodism.

History

19th century 

Previous to the year 1868, the Protestant Churches of Europe and North America knew little or nothing about the province of Sichuan located in western China. The first Protestant missionaries to visit the province were Griffith John of the London Missionary Society (LMS) and Alexander Wylie of the British and Foreign Bible Society (BFBS). However, this journey did not attempt to establish mission stations in any of the many cities or towns visited. Griffith John's report of the journey was undoubtedly instrumental in drawing attention to that region: "There are a large number of Catholics in the province, and Chungking is one of their strongholds. [...] We must not ignore Szechwan. I hope that we will be able to establish the first Protestant Church in Chungking, and I myself could be the first missionary." However, no other missionaries visited the province again until 1877, when Rev. John McCarthy of the China Inland Mission (CIM, interdenominational), after landing at Wanhsien, travelled via Shuenkingfu to Chungking, where he reached on 1 May of that year. There he rented premises for other CIM missionaries to use as a base.

After this there followed a period of widespread evangelistic journeys, in which Messrs. Cameron, Nicoll, Easton, Parker, Riley, S. R. Clarke, and Bailer, all of the CIM, with Mr. Leeman of the American Presbyterian Mission, and Mr. Mollman of the BFBS, engaged. In 1881 the CIM opened the capital, Chengtu, for settled work. After considerable difficulty, Paoning and Pacheo were occupied during the years 1886 and 1887.

In 1882, missionaries of the American Methodist Episcopal Mission (AMEM) arrived in Chungking. Their early efforts encountered strong resistance and riots that led to the abandonment of the mission. It was not until 1889 that these Methodists came back and started the mission again. Their mission concentrated within a diamond-shaped area with the cities of Chengtu, Suining, Tzechung and Chungking as bases. They had an Institutional Church built in Chengtu and a Lewis Memorial Institutional Church in Chungking.

During this period, the CIM divided the work of the mission into two distinct parts, namely Western Szechwan and Eastern Szechwan. The distinction is that, taking the Kialing River, which enters the Yangtse opposite Chungking, as the boundary, all the cities, towns, and villages east of this belonged to the East Szechwan branch of the Mission, which was worked on distinctively Church of England lines; while all the districts west of the Kialing River belonged to the West Szechwan branch of the CIM, and were generally worked on Free Church lines.

The year 1887 marks the arrival of the Anglican representatives of the CIM. William Cassels, the future bishop of the Diocese of Szechwan; Montagu Proctor-Beauchamp, and two brothers, Arthur and Cecil Polhill. All four were members of the Cambridge Seven.

One feature of this period was the persistence and tenacity of the missionaries. Many difficulties and disappointments accompanied their efforts; the people were either indifferent or hostile, and the results of their labours were very small. Sickness and death were constantly occurring to hinder and threaten the existence of the work. The 1886 Chungking riot almost extinguished the little churches which had been gathered by the two Missions. After the settlement of the Chungking riots and the re-establishment of Mission work in that city, a period of unprecedented prosperity set in.

During this period no less than five additional missionary societies started new work in Sichuan. In 1888 the LMS, whose representative Dr. Griffith John, was the first to enter the province in 1868 as mentioned above, took up permanent work in Chungking. In 1889, Robert John and Mary Jane Davidson of Friends' Foreign Mission Association (FFMA) introduced Quakerism into Tungchwan. Within 19 years five monthly meetings were successively established in Chengtu, Chungking, Tungchwan, Tungliang and Suining. In 1890 the American Baptist Missionary Union (ABMU) started work in the west of the province, having Suifu (1890) and Kiatingfu (1894) as their chief centres. Three more stations were established in Yachowfu (1894), Ningyuanfu (1905), and Chengtu (1909). At the close of 1891, the Rev. James Heywood Horsburgh, together with Mrs. Horsburgh, Rev. O. M. Jackson, three laymen, and six single women missionaries, entered Sichuan as the first band of Church Missionary Society (CMS) missionaries to take up work in that province. By 1894, CMS work had started in Mienchow, Chungpa, Anhsien, Mienchu and Sintu. Their first church was founded in 1894 in Chungpa. Then, in 1892, the Canadian Methodist Mission (CMM) opened up work in central and west Sichuan, having Chengtu and Kiating as their headquarters.

In 1895, the Anglican Diocese of Szechwan was established with its seat in Paoning. William Cassels became the first diocesan bishop after his consecration on 18 October 1895 at Westminster Abbey. That same year was also marked by a serious outbreak of anti-foreign agitation began in the capital Chengtu, and thence spread throughout the province. In the capital, the property of three Protestant missions and that of the Roman Catholics was destroyed; and all missionaries of all missions, Protestant and Roman Catholic alike, were thankful to escape with their lives.

In 1897, the Canadian Methodist Mission Press was established in Kiatingfu, but was moved to the capital city of Chengtu in 1903. This press produced publications mostly in English, Tibetan, Chinese and Hua Miao, but also printed language lessons in French and German. In addition to printing for the various missions in the western province, a certain amount of work was done for local schools and non-missionary foreigners. Notable among its printings was The West China Missionary News, first published in 1899, being the first and longest-running English-language newspaper in Sichuan province.

In 1898, a riot known as the  Rebellion was chiefly directed against the Roman Catholics; the Protestants not coming under the wrath of the rebels, though subject to persecution and petty annoyance from local rowdies. During this rebellion a Protestant Conference (January 1899) was held at Chungking, resulting in the establishments of The West China Missionary News and West China Tract Society, as well as the formation of an Advisory Board for West China. From the settlement of the Yü Man-tse Rebellion of 1898 to the Boxer Rebellion in 1900, a period of nearly two years, the work in Sichuan enjoyed a time of peace and quiet, which ended abruptly in the summer of 1900, when all missionaries of all societies were obliged by consular orders to flee to the coast.

20th century 

The Boxer Rebellion did not affect Sichuan so much as some other parts of China. On the return of the missionaries to their respective stations during the early part of 1901 they found in many places, especially in the western parts of Sichuan, what was going to be known later as the Mass Movement in full swing. This movement may be traced back as far as 1895, when it really began, subsequent to the settlement of the riots which occurred at that time. This movement steadily grew till it was crushed by the Yü Man-tse Rebellion, but immediately after the settlement of those troubles it revived with fresh vigour and strength. During that time, however, it was almost entirely confined to the Roman Catholic Church. But after the Boxer settlement, the Mass Movement not only revived amongst the Roman Catholics, but also took hold of the Protestant Church as well. This movement was most perplexing, even to experienced missionaries. Deputations were constantly arriving from the surrounding districts with offers from the gentry and leading men to open Gospel halls, preaching stations, or schools, free of cost to the missionary societies. Long lists were presented with the names of those who were anxious to become "adherents" of the Church or "learners" of the truth. This movement appealed in different ways to different missionaries and missionary societies. Some of the more optimistic welcomed it as an answer to the prayers of past years and the plenteous sowing of the last decades. Others, who were not quite so enthusiastic, looked askance on the movement, and generally discouraged the establishment of stations under such conditions.

A great demand for scientific literature which followed the Boxer outbreak was so pressing that the Society for the Diffusion of Christian Knowledge at Shanghai decided to open a depot in Chengtu to meet this demand. The Society was able to secure the best position in the most important street, and the ever increasing sale of books, charts, maps, and other literature has justified the Society's decision in opening a depot in that remote province of Western China. The Canadian Methodist Mission (CMM), recognising that Chengtu, the capital of the province, was the centre of literary activity and influence, moved their Mission Press to that city in 1903.

One of the signs of the progressive spirit was a scheme for a Union University. Most of the missionaries had seen the importance of educational institutions, and had sought to provide schools and other facilities to meet the demand for Western learning. But since the adoption by China of Western methods of education, the demand for some institution for higher education had been greatly felt by those specially interested in the spiritual welfare of the educated classes. Then finally in 1910, the West China Union University was established in Chengtu. It was the fruit of a collective effort of four Protestant mission societies: American Baptist Foreign Mission Society (ABFMS, American Baptist Churches USA), American Methodist Episcopal Mission (AMEM, Methodist Episcopal Church), Canadian Methodist Mission (CMM, Methodist Church of Canada), and Friends' Foreign Mission Association (FFMA, British Quakers). The Church Missionary Society (CMS, Church of England) became a partner in the university in 1918. The university grew rapidly in its first decade and remained a key player in tertiary education in Sichuan throughout the Republican Era. The American Methodist missionary Joseph Beech, a Wesleyan University graduate and member of Psi Upsilon and Phi Beta Kappa, played an instrumental role in founding and running West China Union University. He served as its founding president and later its chancellor. David Crockett Graham, an American polymath Baptist minister, served as curator of the university's Museum of Art, Archaeology and Ethnology from 1932 to 1942. He also taught comparative religions at its Theological College, as well as archaeology and anthropology.

On 10 May 1906, an American missionary Robert Roy Service and his wife Grace Service arrived in Chengtu. With the help of an English Quaker missionary Henry Hodgkin, they opened up work for the first Young Men's Christian Association (YMCA) mission in the province. Robert and Grace were both graduates of the University of California, Berkeley. He was an athlete, member of Psi Upsilon and president of the senior class and of the YMCA. Grace was a member of Kappa Alpha Theta, and treasurer of the Young Women's Christian Association (YWCA). Through YMCA, an organization founded on the principles of muscular Christianity, Robert introduced Western physical education into the province. In 1910, fields for football and baseball, as well as a tennis court were constructed near the Wen Miao Street in Chengtu; a gymnasium was opened in 1913.

In 1914, the Adventist Mission of the Seventh-day Adventist Church established a mission station in Chungking. Their Szechwan Mission was officially formed in 1917. In 1919, the mission was divided into East Szechwan Mission and West Szechwan Mission for easier administration.

By the end of 1921, there were 12,954 baptized Protestant Christians in Sichuan, the Methodists enrolled almost one half of this number, namely 5,788. The Anglicans shared almost the other half with 5,474 church members. The American Baptists and English Quakers followed with 1,263 and 429 members respectively. 63 per cent of these 12,954 Protestants were men.

By 1922, the Foreign Christian Missionary Society of the Disciples of Christ had its centre at Batang. Due to the constitution of Sichuan at the time, Batang fell outside the western boundary and belonged to the special territory of Chwanpien, a mostly Tibetan-inhabited region.

Lutheranism also had a small presence in Chungking.

By 1934, the Canadian Methodist Mission had joined the Church of Christ in China (CCC); an annual general meeting of the CCC's Szechwan Association was held on 9 February 1939. In 1940, the CCC established a mission station in Lihsien, a county lies in the Sichuan-Khams Tibetan border region, as part of their Border Service Movement. This movement had a marked character of Social Gospel, with the aim of spreading Christianity to the Tibetan, Qiang and Yi peoples.

In 1941 the Bartels started work in the Szechwan-Kansu-Shensi border.

The Kweichow-Szechwan Mission of the Christian and Missionary Alliance (C&MA) had its district on the borders of Kweichow and Szechwan Provinces and adjacent to Hunan and Hupeh Provinces. The C&MA missionary personnel were all withdrawn during the year 1949.

Current situation 
After the communist takeover of China in 1949, Protestant Churches in China were forced to sever their ties with respective overseas Churches, which has thus led to the merging of all the denominations into communist-sanctioned Three-Self Patriotic Church.

Radio Free Asia reported an arrest of eight Christians in 2010 during a gathering of a house church in Suining, while two were beaten. The police detained them for six hours and treated them as if they were criminals. In 2018, Wang Yi, a well-known pastor from Chengtu, along with 100 Christians, were detained by authorities. Wang was reportedly arrested on allegations of "inciting subversion of state power". That same year, four Christian churches in Sichuan have been given an ultimatum and told they must join the Three-Self Church or be shut down. In 2019, 200 congregants in Chengtu began to meet in secret after their state registered Three-Self church has been shut down. On 17 November 2021, police raided the Qingcaodi Reformed Church in Deyang. Days later, one of the church members, Liu Wuyi, was detained criminally. On 14 August 2022, police in Chengtu raided a Sunday gathering of the Early Rain Covenant Church (a congregation of the Reformed tradition founded by Wang Yi) and detained a leader.

Maps

See also 

 Christianity in Sichuan
 Catholic Church in Sichuan
 Anti-Christian Movement (China)
 Anti-missionary riots in China
 Denunciation Movement
 House church (China)
 :Category:Anglicanism in Sichuan
 :Category:Methodism in Sichuan
 :Category:Quakerism in Sichuan
 :Category:Baptist Christianity in Sichuan
 :Category:Protestant churches in Chongqing
 :Category:Protestant churches in Sichuan
 :Category:Protestant missionaries in Sichuan
 :Category:Protestant missionaries in Tibet

References

Bibliography

External links 
 

 
Sichuan
History of Christianity in Sichuan